Chilham is a mostly agricultural village and parish in the English county of Kent with a clustered settlement, Chilham village centre, in the northeast, and a smaller linear settlement, Shottenden. Well-preserved roads and mostly residential listed buildings in its centre have led to its use as a location in television and film.

Settlements
The village of Chilham is in the valley of the Great Stour River and beside the A28 road 6 miles (10 km) southwest of Canterbury. It is centred on a market square, where a traditional annual May Day is celebrated.  At each end of the square are its major buildings: Chilham Castle and the 15th-century parish church, dedicated to St Mary. It has been claimed that St Thomas Becket was buried in the churchyard, despite his ornate tomb in Canterbury Cathedral, destroyed at the Reformation. 

The Pilgrims Way passes through Chilham on the way to Canterbury.

The village has a number of period houses such as the former vicarage, which dates from 1742. The castle was owned by the Viscounts Massereene and Ferrard until its sale in 1997. From 2013 it was owned by Stuart Wheeler, founder of the spread-betting firm IG Index, until his death in July 2020.

The railway station is in a part of the village sometimes called Bagham on the line from Ashford to Canterbury.

There are two other named localities or neighbourhoods in the civil parish: Shottenden and a much smaller neighbourhood, Old Wives Lees.

Amenities 
There are two large public houses in Chilham, the Woolpack and the White Horse, which dates from the 16th century. Other amenities include a restaurant and tea shop, post office, gift shop, bus stop, tennis club, sports centre, children's playground and 15th-century village hall which originally was the tithe barn for the castle. Most shops are also along the main through road towards Canterbury just before the entry to the network of streets having the oldest buildings in the village.

Culture and media
The Neolithic longbarrow of Julliberrie's Grave is on the Julliberrie Downs east of the river.

Chilham and the surrounding area was one of the locations for much of Powell and Pressburger's 1944 film A Canterbury Tale. In 1965 it was used for part of the filming of The Amorous Adventures of Moll Flanders starring Kim Novak, Leo McKern and Angela Lansbury, and it was also used as a location for the BBC's 2009 adaptation of Jane Austen's novel Emma. The village and the castle featured heavily in a fake snow-bound episode of Agatha Christie's Poirot called Hercule Poirot's Christmas starring David Suchet. The village was made over to sunnier times for The Moving Finger, a mystery featuring Agatha Christie's other famous sleuth Miss Jane Marple, portrayed by Geraldine McEwan.

Notable residents
 Sir George Colbrooke, (1729-1809), banker
 Dudley Digges, (1582/3-1639), politician and diplomat
 West Digges (1720-1786), actor and theatre manager
 Philip Francis (1708-1773), writer and translator
 William Ridge (1859-1930), novelist and short-story writer
 Charles Shannon (1863-1937), artist
 Augustus Toplady (1740-1778), cleric

References

External links

Chilham parish

Villages in Kent
Civil parishes in Ashford, Kent